Sixth Avenue Bridge, aka the North Sixth Street Bridge, is a pony truss vehicular bridge over the Passaic River in northeastern New Jersey. It connects the Bunker Hill neighbourhood of Paterson and Prospect Park at the border with Hawthorne via North Sixth Street (CR 652). It was originally constructed 1907 as a steel structure supported on stone masonry piers and abutments and is one of several bridges built after the Passaic Flood of 1903. The older span opened was abruptly closed in 1986 after the Passaic County engineer at the time, Gaetano Fabrina, found that some steel beams had rusted and were "banging and clanging."

In 1987, the crossing was rebuilt with temporary components which have since deteriorated. The simple panel steel-truss structure, cost $850,000 and was built in less than a year to build by the Acrow Corporation of Carlstadt. In 2015, the North Jersey Transportation Planning Authority granted funds to study the bridges eventual restoration or replacement.

See also
 Arch Street Bridge
 Straight Street Bridge
 West Broadway Bridge
 List of crossings of the Upper Passaic River
 List of crossings of the Lower Passaic River
 List of crossings of the Hackensack River
 Passaic River Flood Tunnel

References 

Bridges over the Passaic River
Bridges completed in 1905
Road bridges in New Jersey
Transportation in Paterson, New Jersey
Buildings and structures in Paterson, New Jersey
Bridges in Passaic County, New Jersey
Prospect Park, New Jersey
Steel bridges in the United States
1905 establishments in New Jersey